August (Fryderyk) Duranowski (originally Auguste Frédéric Durand) (c 1770–1834) was a Polish-born French violinist and composer.

Biography
Duranowski was born in Warsaw.  He studied the violin in Paris with Giovanni Battista Viotti, becoming leader of the Brussels opera orchestra in 1790. He toured Europe and settled in Strasbourg. One of the most eminent virtuosos of his time and an important influence on Niccolò Paganini, he was known for his extraordinary technique, especially in trilling, bowing and passage-work. Among his compositions, the Concerto in A major op.8 and airs variés for violin and orchestra are noteworthy.  He died at Strasbourg.

References

External links
 

1770 births
1834 deaths
Musicians from Warsaw
French male classical composers
Polish composers
French Classical-period composers
French Romantic composers
Polish classical violinists
19th-century French male classical violinists
Composers for violin
Polish emigrants to France
19th-century classical composers
19th-century French composers